State leaders in the 6th century BC – State leaders in the 4th century BC – State leaders by year

This is a list of state leaders in the 5th century BC (500–401 BC).

Africa: North

Carthage

Carthage: Magonids (complete list) –
Hamilcar I, King (c.510–480 BC)
Hanno II, King (480–440 BC)
Himilco I, King ((in Sicily) 460–410 BC)
Hannibal I, King (440–406 BC)
Himilco II, King (406–396 BC)

Cyrene

Cyrene (complete list) –
Battus IV, King (515–465 BC)
Arcesilaus IV, King (465–440 BC)

Egypt: Late Period

Twenty-eighth Dynasty of the Late Period (complete list) –
Amyrtaeus, Pharaoh (404–398 BC)

Kush

Kush (complete list) –
Amaniastabarqa, King (510–487 BC)
Siaspiqa, King (487–468 BC))
Nasakhma, King (468–463 BC)
Malewiebamani, King (463–435 BC)
Talakhamani, King (435–431 BC)
Amanineteyerike, King (431–405 BC)
Baskakeren, King (405–404 BC)
Harsiotef, King (404–369 BC)

Asia

Asia: East

China: Spring and Autumn period (771–c.453 BC)

Zhou, China: Eastern Zhou (complete list) –
Jìng, King (519–477 BC)
Yuan, King (476–469 BC)
Zhending, King (468–441 BC)

Cai (complete list) –
Zhao, Marquis (518–491 BC)
Cheng, Marquis (490–472 BC)
Sheng, Marquis (471–457 BC)
Yuan, Marquis (456–451 BC)
Qi, Marquis (450–447 BC)

Cao (complete list) –
Cao Bo Yang, ruler (501–487 BC)

Chen (complete list) –
Hui, Duke (6th–5th century BC)
Huai, Duke (c.5th century BC)
Min, Duke (5th century BC)

Chu (complete list) –
Zhao, King (515–489 BC)
Hui, King (488–432 BC)
Jian, King (431–408 BC)

Jin (complete list) –
Ding, Duke (511–475 BC)
Chu, Duke (474–452 BC)
Jing, Duke (451–434 BC)
You, Duke (433–416 BC)
Lie, Duke (415–389 BC)

Lu (complete list) –
Ding, Duke (509–495 BC)
Ai, Duke (494–467 BC)
Dao, Duke (466–429 BC)
Yuan, Duke (428–408 BC)
Mu, Duke (407–377 BC)

Qi: House of Jiang (complete list) –
Jing, Duke (547–490 BC)
An Ruzi, ruler (489 BC)
Dao, Duke (488–485 BC)
Jian, Duke (484–481 BC)
Ping, Duke (480–456 BC)
Xuan, Duke (455–405 BC)

Qin (complete list) –
Hui I, Duke (500–492 BC)
Dao, Duke (491–477 BC)
Ligong, Duke (476–443 BC)

Song (complete list) –
Jing, Duke (516–451 BC)
Zhao, Duke (450–404 BC)
Dao, Duke (403–396 BC)

Wey (complete list) –
Ling, Duke (534–493 BC)
Chu, Duke (492–481 BC)
Zhuang, Duke (480–478 BC)

Wu (complete list) –
Helü, King (515–496 BC)
Fuchai, King (495–473 BC)

Yue (complete list) –
Yunchang of Yue, King (?─497 BC)
Goujian of Yue, King (496─465 BC)
Luying of Yue, King (465─459 BC)
Bushou of Yue, King (459─449 BC)
Weng of Yue, King (449─412 BC)
Yi of Yue, King (412─376 BC)

Zheng (complete list) –
Sheng, Duke (500–463 BC)
Ai, Duke (462–455 BC)
Gong, Duke (455–424 BC)
You, Duke (423 BC)
Xu, Duke (422–396 BC)

China: Warring States period (c.453–221 BC)

Zhou, China: Eastern Zhou (complete list) –
Zhending, King (468–441 BC)
Ai, King (441 BC)
Si, King (441 BC)
Kao, King (440–426 BC)
Weilie, King (425–402 BC)
An, King (401–376 BC)

Chu (complete list) –
Jian, King (431–408 BC)
Sheng, King (407–402 BC)
Dao, King (401–381 BC)

Han (complete list) –
Wuzi, ruler (424–409 BC)
Jing, Marquess (408–400 BC)

Qi: House of Jiang (complete list) –
Xuan, Duke (455–405 BC)
Kang, Duke (404–386 BC)

Qi: House of Tian (complete list) –
Tai, Duke (404–384 BC)

Qin (complete list) –
Ligong, Duke (476–443 BC)
Zao, Duke (442–429 BC)
Huai, Duke (428–425 BC)
Ling, Duke (424–415 BC)
Jian, Duke (414–400 BC)

Wei (complete list) –
Wen, Marquess (445–396 BC)

Zhao (complete list) –
Xian, Marquess (424–409 BC)
Lie, Marquess (409–387 BC)

Asia: Southeast
Vietnam
Hồng Bàng dynasty (complete list) –
Nhâm line, King (c.568–408 BC)
Hùng Duệ Vương, King (408–258 BC)

Asia: South

India

Magadha: Haryanka dynasty (complete list) –
Bimbisara (c.544–c.492 BC)
Ajatashatru (c.492–c.460 BCE)
Udayin, King (c.460–c.440 BC)
Anuruddha, King (c.440 BC–?)
Munda, King (?–c.437 BC)
Nāgadāsaka, King (c.437–c.413 BC)

Magadha: Shishunaga dynasty (complete list) –
Shishunaga, King (413–395 BC)

Sri Lanka

Asia: West

Bosporan Kingdom:Spartocids dynasty (complete list) –
Spartocus I, King (438–433 BC)
Satyrus I, King (433–389 BC) 
Seleucus, King (433–393 BC)

First Persian Empire: Achaemenid Empire(complete list) –
Darius I, King of Kings (522–486 BC)
Xerxes I, King of Kings (485–465 BC)
Artaxerxes I, King of Kings (464–424 BC)
Xerxes II, Great King, Shah (424 BC)
Sogdianus, Great King, Shah (424–423 BC)
Darius II, Great King, Shah (423–404 BC)
Artaxerxes II, Great King, Shah (404–358 BC)

Europe

Europe: Balkans

Athens (complete list) –

Hermocreon, Archon (501–500 BC)
Smyrus (?), Archon (500–499 BC)
Archias, Archon (497–496 BC)
Hipparchus, Archon (496–495 BC)
Philippus, Archon (495–494 BC)
Pythocritus, Archon (494–493 BC)
Themistocles, Archon (493–492 BC)
Diognetus, Archon (492–491 BC)
Hybrilides, Archon (491–490 BC)
Phaenippus, Archon (490–489 BC)
Aristides the Just, Archon (489–488 BC)
Anchises, Archon (488–487 BC)
Telesinus, Archon (487–486 BC)
Philocrates, Archon (485–484 BC)
Leostratus, Archon (484–483 BC)
Nicodemus, Archon (483–482 BC)
Hypsichides, Archon (481–480 BC)
Calliades, Archon (480–479 BC) 
Xanthippus, Archon (479–478 BC)
Timosthenes, Archon (478–477 BC)
Adimantus, Archon (477–476 BC)
Phaedon, Archon (476–475 BC)
Dromoclides, Archon (475–474 BC)
Acestorides, Archon (474–473 BC)
Menon, Archon (473–472 BC)
Chares, Archon (472–471 BC)
Praxiergus, Archon (471–470 BC)
Demotion, Archon (470–469 BC)
Apsephion, Archon (469–468 BC)
Theagenides, Archon (468–467 BC)

Lysistratus, Archon (467–466 BC)
Lysanias, Archon (466–465 BC)
Lysitheus, Archon (465–464 BC)
Archedemides, Archon (464–463 BC)
Tlepolemus, Archon (463–462 BC)
Conon, Archon (462–461 BC)
Euthippus, Archon (461–460 BC)
Phrasicles, Archon (460–459 BC)
Philocles, Archon (459–458 BC)
Habron, Archon (458–457 BC)
Mnesitheides, Archon (457–456 BC)
Callias, Archon (456–455 BC)
Sosistratus, Archon (455–454 BC)
Ariston, Archon (454–453 BC)
Lysicrates, Archon (453–452 BC)
Chaerephanes, Archon (452–451 BC)
Antidotus, Archon (451–450 BC)
Euthydemus, Archon (450–449 BC)
Pedieus, Archon (449–448 BC)
Philiscus, Archon (448–447 BC)
Timarchides, Archon (447–446 BC)
Callimachus, Archon (446–445 BC)
Lysimachides, Archon (445–444 BC)
Praxiteles, Archon (444–443 BC)
Lysanias, Archon (443–442 BC)
Diphilus, Archon (442–441 BC)
Timocles, Archon (441–440 BC)
Morychides, Archon (440–439 BC)
Glaukinos, Archon (439–438 BC)
Theodorus, Archon (438–437 BC)
Euthymenes, Archon (437–436 BC)
Lysimachus, Archon (436–435 BC)
Antiochides, Archon (435–434 BC)

Krates, Archon (434–433 BC)
Apseudes, Archon (433–432 BC)
Pythodorus, Archon (432–431 BC)
Euthydemus, Archon (431–430 BC)
Apollodorus, Archon (430–429 BC)
Epameinon, Archon (429–428 BC)
Diotimus, Archon (428–427 BC)
Eukles, Archon (427–426 BC)
Euthynos, Archon (426–425 BC)
Stratocles, Archon (425–424 BC)
Isarchus, Archon (424–423 BC)
Amynias, Archon (423–422 BC)
Alcaeus, Archon (422–421 BC)
Aristion, Archon (421–420 BC)
Astyphilus, Archon (420–419 BC)
Archias, Archon (419–418 BC)
Antiphon, Archon (418–417 BC)
Euphemus, Archon (417–416 BC)
Arimnestus, Archon (416–415 BC)
Charias, Archon (415–414 BC)
Tisandrus, Archon (414–413 BC)
Cleocritus, Archon (413–412 BC)
Callias Scambonides, Archon (412–411 BC)
Mnasilochus (died); Theopompus, Archon (411–410 BC)
Glaucippus, Archon (410–409 BC)
Diocles, Archon (409–408 BC)
Euctemon, Archon (408–407 BC)
Antigenes, Archon (407–406 BC)
Callias Angelides, Archon (406–405 BC)
Alexias, Archon (405–404 BC)
Pythodorus, Archon (404–403 BC)
Eucleides, Archon (403–402 BC)
Mikon, Archon (402–401 BC)
Xenainetos, Archon (401–400 BC)

Dacia (complete list) –
Charnabon, King (5th century BC)

Illyrian Kingdoms  (complete list) 
Grabos I, King of Grabei
Sirras, maybe a son of Grabos, a prince, royal member and perhaps prince-regent of Lynkestis (Lyncestis) in Upper Macedonia for his father-in-law King Arrhabaeus (c. 423–393 BC)

Epirus (complete list)
Admetus, King (before 470–430 BC)
Tharrhypas, King (430–392 BC)

Macedonia: Argead dynasty (complete list) –
Amyntas I, King (547–498 BC)
Alexander I, King (498–454 BC)
Alcetas II, King (454–448 BC)
Perdiccas II, King (448–413 BC)
Archelaus I, King (413–399 BC)

Odrysian kingdom of Thrace (complete list) –
Teres I, King (460–445 BC) 
Sparatocos, King (450–431 BC)
Sitalces, King (431–424 BC)
Seuthes I, King (424–410 BC)
Amadocus I, King (408–389 BC) 
Seuthes II, King (405–387 BC)

Sparta (complete list) –
Ariston, King (c.550–515 BC)
Demaratus, King (c.515–491 BC)
Leotychidas, King (c.491–469 BC)
Archidamus II, King (c.469–427 BC)
Agis II, King (c.427–401/400 BC)
Agesilaus II, King (c.401/400–360 BC)

Europe: South

Roman Republic (complete list) –

 
500
Ser. Sulpicius Camerinus Cornutus, Consul
M' Tullius Longus, Consul
499
T. Aebutius Elva, Consul
P. (or C.) Veturius Geminus Cicurinus, Consul
498
Q. Cloelius Siculus, Consul
T. Lartius Flavus (or Rufus) II, Consul
497
A. Sempronius Atratinus, Consul
M. Minucius Augurinus, Consul
496
A. Postumius Albus Regillensis, Consul
T. Verginius Tricostus Caeliomontanus, Consul
495
Ap. Claudius Sabinus Regillensis, Consul
P. Servilius Priscus Structus, Consul
494
A. Verginius Tricostus Caeliomontanus, Consul
T. Veturius Geminus Cicurinus, Consul
Manius Valerius Maximus, Dictator (494 BC)
493
Post. Cominius Auruncus II, Consul
Sp. Cassius Vecellinus, Consul
492
T. Geganius Macerinus, Consul
P. Minucius Augurinus, Consul
491
M. Minucius Augurinus, Consul
A. Sempronius Atratinus, Consul
490
Q. Sulpicius Camerinus Cornutus, Consul
Sp. Larcius Rufus (or Flavus) II, Consul
489
C. Julius Iulus, Consul
P. Pinarius Mamercinus Rufus, Consul
488
Sp. Nautius Rutilus, Consul
Sex. Furius, Consul
487
T. Sicinius (Sabinus?), Consul
C. Aquillius, Consul
486
Sp. Cassius Vecellinus, Consul
Proculus Verginius Tricostus Rutilus, Consul
485
Ser. Cornelius Maluginensis, Consul
Q. Fabius Vibulanus, Consul
484
L. Aemilius Mamercus, Consul
K. Fabius Vibulanus, Consul
483
M. Fabius Vibulanus, Consul
L. Valerius Potitus, Consul
482
Q. Fabius Vibulanus, Consul
C. Julius Iullus, Consul
481
K. Fabius Vibulanus, Consul
Sp. Furius Fusus, Consul
480
M. Fabius Vibulanus, Consul
Cn. Manlius Cincinnatus, Consul
479
K. Fabius Vibulanus, Consul
T. Verginius Tricostus Rutilus, Consul
478
L. Aemilius Mamercus, Consul
C. Servilius Structus Ahala, Consul
Opet. Verginius Tricostus Esquilinus, Consul suffectus
477
C. (or M.) Horatius Pulvillus, Consul
T. Menenius Lanatus, Consul
476
A. Verginius Tricostus Rutilus, Consul
Sp. (or P.) Servilius Structus, Consul
475
P. Valerius Poplicola, Consul
C. Nautius Rutilus, Consul
474
L. Furius Medullinus, Consul
A. (or Cn.) Manlius Vulso, Consul
473
L. Aemilius Mamercus, Consul
Vop. Julius Iulus, Consul
472
L. Pinarius Mamercinus Rufus, Consul
P. Furius Medullinus Fusus, Consul
471
Ap. Claudius Sabinus, Consul
T. Quinctius Capitolinus Barbatus, Consul
470
L. Valerius Potitus, Consul
Ti. Aemilius Mamercus, Consul
469
T. Numicius Priscus, Consul
A. Verginius Caeliomontanus, Consul
468
T. Quinctius Capitolinus Barbatus, Consul
Q. Servilius Structus Priscus, Consul

467
Ti. Aemilius Mamercus, Consul
Q. Fabius Vibulanus, Consul
466
Q. Servilius (Structus) Priscus, Consul
Sp. Postumius Albinus Regillensis, Consul
465
Q. Fabius Vibulanus, Consul
T. Quinctius Capitolinus Barbatus, Consul
464
A. Postumius Albinus Regillensis, Consul
Sp. Furius Medullinus Fusus, Consul
463
P. Servilius Priscus, Consul
L. Aebutius Helva, Consul
462
L. Lucretius Tricipitinus, Consul
T. Veturius Geminus Cicurinus, Consul
461
P. Volumnius Amintinus Gallus, Consul
Ser. (or P.) Sulpicius Camerinus Cornutus, Consul
460
P. Valerius Poplicola, Consul
C. Claudius Sabinus Regillensis, Consul
L. Quinctius Cincinnatus, Consul suffectus
459
Q. Fabius Vibulanus, Consul
L. Cornelius Maluginensis Uritinus, Consul
458
C. Nautius Rutilus, Consul
L. Minucius Esquilinus Augurinus, Consul
L. Quinctius Cincinnatus, Dictator (458 BC)
457
C. Horatius Pulvillus or: L. Quinctius Cincinnatus, Consul
Q. Minucius Esquilinus Augurinus or: M. Fabius Vibulanus, Consul
456
M. Valerius Maximus Lactuca, Consul
Sp. Verginius Tricostus Caeliomontanus, Consul
455
T. Romilius Rocus Vaticanus, Consul
C. Veturius Cicurinus, Consul
454
Sp. Tarpeius Montanus Capitolinus, Consul
A. Aternius Varus Fontinalis, Consul
453
Sex. Quinctilius, Consul
P. Curiatius Fistus Trigeminus, Consul
Sp. Furius Medullinus Fusus, Consul suffectus
452
T. Menenius Lanatus, Consul
P. Sestius Capitolinus Vaticanus, Consul
451
Ap. Claudius Crassus Inregillensis Sabinus, Consul
T. Genucius Augurinus, Consul
Decemviri: Ap. Claudius Crassus Inregillensis Sabinus, A. Manlius Vulso, T. Genucius Augurinus, P. or Ser. Sulpicius Camerinus Cornutus, T. or Sp. or L. Veturius Crassus Cicurinus, P. Curiatius Fistus Trigeminus, P. Sestius Capito Vaticanus, T. Romilius Rocus Vaticanus, C. Julius Iulus, Sp. Postumius Albus Regillensis
450 – Decemviri: Ap. Claudius Crassus Inregillensis Sabinus, Q. Poetelius Libo Visolus, M. Cornelius Maluginensis, T. Antonius Merenda, M. Sergius Esquilinus, K. Duillius, L. Minucius Esquilinus Augurinus, Sp. Oppius Cornicen, Q. Fabius Vibulanus, M' Rabuleius
449 – Decemviri: Ap. Claudius Crassus Sabinus Regillensis, Q. Poetelius Libo Visolus, M. Cornelius Maluginensis, T. Antonius Merenda, M. Sergius Esquilinus, K. Duillius, L. Minucius Esquilinus Augurinus, Sp. Oppius Cornicen, Q. Fabius Vibulanus, M' Rabuleius, L. Valerius Potitus, M. Horatius (Tu?)rrinus Barbatus
448
Lars (or Sp.) Herminius Coritinesanus, Consul
T. Verginius Tricostus Caeliomontanus, Consul
447
M. Geganius Macerinus, Consul
C. Julius Iulus, Consul
446
T. Quinctius Capitolinus Barbatus, Consul
Agrippa Furius Fusus, Consul
445
M. Genucius Augurinus, Consul
C. (or Agrippa) Curtius Philo, Consul
444 – Consular Tribunes: A. Sempronius Atratinus, T. Cloelius Siculus, L. Atilius Luscus, L. Papirius Mugillanus, L. Sempronius Atratinus
443
M. Geganius Macerinus, Consul
T. Quinctius Capitolinus Barbatus, Consul
442
M. Fabius Vibulanus, Consul
Post. Aebutius Helva Cornicen, Consul
441
C. Furius Pacilus Fusus, Consul
M. (or M') Papirius Crassus, Consul
440
Proc. Geganius Macerinus, Consul
L. Menenius Lanatus or: T. Menenius Lanatus, Consul
439
Agrippa Menenius Lanatus, Consul
T. Quinctius Capitolinus Barbatus, Consul
Lucius Quinctius Cincinnatus, Dictator (439 BC)
438 – Consular Tribunes: Mam. Aemilius Macerinus, L. Julius Iulus, L. Quinctius Cincinnatus

437
M. Geganius Macerinus, Consul
L. Sergius Fidenas, Consul
M. Valerius Lactuca Maximus, Consul suffectus
436
L. Papirius Crassus, Consul
M. Cornelius Maluginensis, Consul
435
C. Julius Iulus), Consul
L. (or Proc.) Verginius Tricostus, Consul
434
C. Julius Iulus or: M. Manlius Capitolinus, Consul
L. (or Proc.) Verginius Tricostus  or Q. Sulpicius Camerinus Praetextatus, Consul – Consular Tribunes: Ser. Cornelius Cossus, Q. Sulpicius Camerinus Praetextatus, M. Manlius Capitolinus
433 – Consular Tribunes: M. Fabius Vibulanus, L. Sergius Fidenas, M. Folius Flaccinator
432 – Consular Tribunes: L. Pinarius Mamercus, Sp. Postumius Albus Regillensis, L. Furius Medullinus
431
T. Quinctius Pennus Cincinnatus, Consul
C. (or Cn.) Iulius Mento, Consul
430
C. (or L.) Papirius Crassus, Consul
L. Julius Iulus, Consul
429
Hostus Lucretius Tricipitinus, Consul
L. Sergius Fidenas, Consul
428
A. Cornelius Cossus or L. Quinctius Cincinnatus, Consul
T. Quinctius Pennus Cincinnatus or A. Sempronius Atratinus, Consul
427
C. Servilius Ahala, Consul
L. Papirius Mugillanus, Consul
426 – Consular Tribunes: T. Quinctius Pennus Cincinnatus, M. Postumius ---, C. Furius Pacilus Fusus, A. Cornelius Cossus
425 – Consular Tribunes: A. Sempronius Atratinus, L. Furius Medullinus, L. Quinctius Cincinnatus, L. Horatius Barbatus
424 – Consular Tribunes: Ap. Claudius Crassus, L. Sergius Fidenas, Sp. Nautius Rutilus, Sex. Julius Iulus
423
C. Sempronius Atratinus, Consul
Q. Fabius Vibulanus Ambustus, Consul
422 – Consular Tribunes: L. Manlius Capitolinus, L. Papirius Mugillanus, Q. Antonius Merenda
421
N. (or Cn.) Fabius Vibulanus, Consul
T. Quinctius Capitolinus Barbatus, Consul
420 – Consular Tribunes: L. Quinctius Cincinnatus  or: T. Quinctius Pennus Cincinnatus, M. Manlius Vulso, L. Furius Medullinus, A. Sempronius Atratinus
419 – Consular Tribunes: Agrippa Menenius Lanatus, Sp. Nautius Rutilus, P. Lucretius Tricipitinus, C. Servilius Axilla
418 – Consular Tribunes: L. Sergius Fidenas, C. Servilius Axilla, M. Papirius Mugillanus
417 – Consular Tribunes: P. Lucretius Tricipitinus, Agrippa Menenius Lanatus, Sp. Rutilius Crassus or: Sp. Veturius Crassus Cicurinus, C. Servilius Axilla
416 – Consular Tribunes: A. Sempronius Atratinus, Q. Fabius Vibulanus Ambustus, M. Papirius Mugillanus, Sp. Nautius Rutilus
415 – Consular Tribunes: P. Cornelius Cossus, N. Fabius Vibulanus, C. Valerius Potitus Volusus, Q. Quinctius Cincinnatus
414 – Consular Tribunes: Cn. Cornelius Cossus, Q. Fabius Vibulanus Ambustus, L. Valerius Potitus, P. Postumius Albinus Regillensis
413
A. Cornelius Cossus, Consul
L. Furius Medullinus, Consul
412
Q. Fabius Vibulanus Ambustus, Consul
C. Furius Pacilus, Consul
411
M. Papirius Mugillanus (or Atratinus?), Consul
Sp. Nautius Rutilus, Consul
410
M' Aemilius Mamercinus, Consul
C. Valerius Potitus Volusus, Consul
409
Cn. Cornelius Cossus, Consul
L. Furius Medullinus, Consul
408 – Consular Tribunes: C. Julius Iulus, C. Servilius Ahala, P. Cornelius Cossus
407 – Consular Tribunes: L. Furius Medullinus, N. Fabius Vibulanus, C. Valerius Potitus Volusus, C. Servilius Ahala
406 – Consular Tribunes: P. Cornelius Rutilus Cossus, N. Fabius Ambustus'', Cn. Cornelius Cossus, L. Valerius Potitus
405 – Consular Tribunes: T. Quinctius Capitolinus Barbatus, A. Manlius Vulso Capitolinus, Q. Quinctius Cincinnatus, L. Furius Medullinus, C. Julius Iulus, M' Aemilius Mamercinus
404 – Consular Tribunes: C. Valerius Potitus Volusus, Cn. Cornelius Cossus, M' Sergius Fidenas, K. Fabius Ambustus, P. Cornelius Maluginensis, Sp. Nautius Rutilus
403 – Consular Tribunes: M' Aemilius Mamercinus, M. Quinctilius Varus, L. Valerius Potitus, L. Julius Iulus, Ap. Claudius Crassus, M. Furius Fusus
402 – Consular Tribunes: C. Servilius Ahala, Q. Sulpicius Camerinus Cornutus, Q. Servilius Fidenas, A. Manlius Vulso Capitolinus, L. Verginius Tricostus Esquilinus, M' Sergius Fidenas
401 – Consular Tribunes: L. Valerius Potitus, Cn. Cornelius Cossus, M. Furius Camillus, K. Fabius Ambustus, M' Aemilius Mamercinus, L. Julius Iulus

Syracuse (complete list) –
Gelo, Tyrant (485–478 BC)
Hiero I, Tyrant (478–466 BC)
Thrasybulus, Tyrant (466–465 BC)
Dionysius the Elder, Tyrant (405–367 BC)

Eurasia: Caucasus

Kingdom of Armenia (complete list) –
Hidarnes II, King (early 5th century BC)
Hidarnes III, King (mid 5th century BC)
Artasyrus, King (5th century BC)
Orontes I, Satrap (401–344 BC)

References

State Leaders
-
5th-century BC rulers